The South Australian Civil and Administrative Tribunal is an Administrative law Tribunal established in 2015 . The Tribunal was created by the South Australian Civil and Administrative Tribunal Act 2013.

References

External links
 South Australian Civil and Administrative Tribunal website
 South Australian Civil and Administrative Tribunal Act 2013 at Austlii 

South Australian courts and tribunals
Australian tribunals
2015 establishments in Australia
Courts and tribunals established in 2015